Goetschy Island is a low rocky island lying near the middle of Peltier Channel in the Palmer Archipelago, Antarctica. It was first charted and named by the French Antarctic Expedition, 1903–05, under Jean-Baptiste Charcot.

See also 
 List of Antarctic and sub-Antarctic islands

References

Islands of the Palmer Archipelago